James William Colborn (born May 22, 1946) is a former Major League Baseball pitcher. The right-handed Colborn pitched for the Chicago Cubs (-), Milwaukee Brewers (-), Kansas City Royals (-) and Seattle Mariners (1978).

Biography 
After graduating from Whittier College with a degree in sociology, Colborn studied for his master's degree at the University of Edinburgh in Scotland, where he also starred in basketball as well as baseball, being named all-Scotland.

In 1967, the Chicago Cubs signed Colborn as an amateur free agent. He found himself in Leo Durocher's doghouse after struggling as a young relief pitcher for three years. Colborn was traded along with Brock Davis and Earl Stephenson to the Brewers for José Cardenal on December 3, 1971.

Colborn was the Brewers' first-ever 20-game winner in 1973, posting a 20–12 record with a 3.18 ERA. He also was named to the American League All-Star team, but did not pitch in the game.

In 1977, Colborn won 18 games for a Royal team that won the second of three consecutive American League West titles (all three times, however, the Royals lost to the New York Yankees in the American League Championship Series; Colborn did not pitch in the 1977 ALCS). On May 14 of that year, Colborn no-hit the Texas Rangers 6–0, the first no-hitter by a Royal at Royals Stadium and second overall in that park, after the first of Nolan Ryan's seven career no-hitters (1973). He was dealt from the Royals to the Mariners for Steve Braun on May 31, 1978.

In , Colborn became the Texas Rangers bullpen coach.

In his career, Colborn won 83 games against 88 losses, with a 3.80 ERA and 688 strikeouts in 1597 innings pitched.

See also
 List of Major League Baseball no-hitters

References

External links

Baseball Gauge
Retrosheet
Venezuelan Professional Baseball League
Box score of Jim Colborn's no-hitter

   

American League All-Stars
Baseball players from California
Major League Baseball pitchers
1946 births
Living people
People from Santa Paula, California
Sportspeople from Ventura County, California
Alumni of the University of Edinburgh
Arizona Instructional League Cubs players
Chicago Cubs players
Kansas City Royals players
Leones del Caracas players
American expatriate baseball players in Venezuela
Lodi Crushers players
Los Angeles Dodgers coaches
Major League Baseball bullpen coaches
Major League Baseball pitching coaches
Milwaukee Brewers players
Minor league baseball managers
Pittsburgh Pirates coaches
San Antonio Missions players
Seattle Mariners players
Seattle Mariners scouts
Tacoma Cubs players
Texas Rangers coaches
Texas Rangers scouts
Whittier Poets baseball players
Washington Huskies baseball players